Granotoma albrechti is a species of sea snail, a marine gastropod mollusk in the family Mangeliidae.

Description
The length of the shell varies between 6 mm and 11.5 mm.

Distribution
This species occurs in the Bering Sea, the Arctic and the Sea of Japan.

References

 Krause, A. (1885). Ein Beitrag zur kenntnis der Molluskenfauna des Beringsmeres. II. Gastropods und Pteropoda. Archiv für Naturgeschichte. 51(1): 256–302, pls 16-18

External links
 
  Tucker, J.K. 2004 Catalog of recent and fossil turrids (Mollusca: Gastropoda). Zootaxa 682:1-1295.
  Gulbin, Vladimir V. "Review of the Shell-bearing Gastropods in the Russian Waters of the East Sea (Sea of Japan). III. Caenogastropoda: Neogastropoda." The Korean Journal of Malacology 25.1 (2009): 51-70.

albrechti
Gastropods described in 1885